Majdan Kawęczyński is a village in the administrative district of Gmina Piaski, within Świdnik County, Lublin Voivodeship, in eastern Poland.

The village has an approximate population of 160.

References

Villages in Świdnik County